John E. Osborn (July 12, 1936 – May 30, 2011) was an American mathematician. He obtained B.S. (1958), M.S. (1963), and Ph.D. (1965) degrees at the University of Minnesota, Minneapolis. His Ph.D. adviser was Hans Weinberger.  Osborn made fundamental contributions to computational mathematics, especially to the theory of numerical solution of partial differential equations, eigenvalue approximations, and the finite element method.  He also co-authored several textbooks on differential equations and numerical computation with the goal of introducing computation into sophomore level differential equations courses.

Osborn held a faculty position at the University of Maryland, College Park his entire career, from 1965 until retiring in 2008. By 1975 he was a full professor, and took on the role of Mathematics Chair in 1982–1985. He served as acting or interim dean for two years, 1989–90 and 1998–99. He also held many visiting positions worldwide.

He was a frequent collaborator and coauthor of Ivo Babuška.

The Memorial Service for Osborn took place at the University of Maryland's Memorial Chapel on September 21, 2011.

John E. Osborn supervised four PhD students.

Notes

Selected references

20th-century American mathematicians
21st-century American mathematicians
Numerical analysts
University of Minnesota College of Science and Engineering alumni
University of Maryland, College Park faculty
People from Mille Lacs County, Minnesota
1936 births
2011 deaths